Khin Myo Win (born 10 February 1999) is a Burmese footballer who plays as a defender for the Myanmar women's national team.

See also
List of Myanmar women's international footballers

References

1999 births
Living people
Women's association football defenders
Burmese women's footballers
People from Kachin State
Myanmar women's international footballers